Greatest Hits is the first greatest hits compilation album by American hard rock band Aerosmith, released by Columbia Records on November 11, 1980.

Release and reception 

Although the official website for Aerosmith lists the release for Greatest Hits as October 1980, and the album was originally scheduled for release on October 24, 1980, it was delayed until November 11, 1980.

Some of the tracks were significantly edited from their original versions. The single version of "Same Old Song and Dance" was used, and was edited down almost a full minute. It also contained an alternate lyric which was not heard on Get Your Wings. The original lyric was "Gotcha with the cocaine, found with your gun." The alternate lyric, included on the compilation, was "You shady lookin' loser, you played with my gun." "Sweet Emotion" also used the single version; it begins with the first chorus, cutting out the now famous talk box intro and the coda was replaced with a repeating chorus and fades out. "Kings and Queens" was also edited down, cutting the intro and certain other parts. "Walk This Way" was edited slightly, chanting the first chorus once instead of twice. The other remaining tracks were kept intact.

On April 21, 1997, a slightly revised version, Greatest Hits 1973–1988, was released outside the US, with the ten tracks in their edited versions retained, with five additional songs from the same era added, plus the 1991 version of "Sweet Emotion" and a live version of "One Way Street".

Greatest Hits is the band's highest RIAA certified album in the United States, having been certified 12× Platinum in 2021.

Track listing

Original version

Track listing - 1997 reissue
Track details same as Original Version track listing, except where noted.

Personnel
Aerosmith
Steven Tyler – lead vocals, harmonica, percussion, producer, arrangement
Joe Perry – lead guitar, rhythm guitar, backing vocals, arrangement, except on "Lightning Strikes"
Brad Whitford – rhythm and lead guitar, producer, arrangement
Tom Hamilton – bass, producer, arrangement
Joey Kramer – drums, producer, arrangement
Additional musicians
Jimmy Crespo – lead guitar, backing vocals on "Lightning Strikes"
Michael Brecker – tenor saxophone on "Same Old Song and Dance" and "Big Ten Inch Record"
Randy Brecker – trumpet on "Same Old Song and Dance"
Stan Bronstein – baritone saxophone on "Same Old Song and Dance"
Jon Pearson – trombone on "Same Old Song and Dance"
David Woodford – saxophone on "Mama Kin"
Scott Cushnie – keyboards, piano on "Big Ten Inch Record"
Jay Messina – bass marimba on "Sweet Emotion"
Production
Jack Douglas – producer, arrangement
Adrian Barber – producer
George Martin – producer
Ray Colcord – producer
Jay Messina – engineer
Vic Anesini – remastering
Janet Perr – cover concept
John Berg – design

Charts

Weekly charts

Year-end charts

Certifications

Release history

See also 

List of best-selling albums in the United States

References

External links

1980 greatest hits albums
Aerosmith compilation albums
Columbia Records compilation albums
Albums produced by Jack Douglas (record producer)